Diprung Chuichumma is a rural municipality (gaunpalika), and one of eight rural municipalities located in Khotang District of Province No. 1 in Nepal. There are a total of 10 municipalities in Khotang in which 2 are urban and 8 are rural.

The separate Village Development Committees (VDCs) of Chhitapokhari, Chhorambu, Dandagaun, Batase, Yamkhya, Tempa and Santeshwar Chhitapokhari were consolidated to form Diprung Chuichumma. Fulfilling the requirement of the new Constitution of Nepal 2015, the Ministry of Federal Affairs and Local Development replaced all old VDCs and Municipalities into 753 new local-level bodies (Municipality).

Diprung Chuichumma rural municipality is divided into total 7 wards and the headquarters of this newly formed rural municipality are in Chhitapokhari.

References

External links
 Official website
 Final District 1-75 Corrected Last for RAJPATRA

Rural municipalities in Koshi Province
Populated places in Khotang District
Rural municipalities of Nepal established in 2017
Rural municipalities in Khotang District